Firoz Chuttipara is an Indian YouTube personality based in Kerala, India. He is better known for his YouTube channel Village Food Channel. Chuttipara is notable for producing Food related YouTube videos.

Early life and career
Chuttipara was born in Elappully village in Palakkad, Kerala. Firoz worked as a welder in Saudi Arabia from 2007 to 2012. After returning home in 2012, he did not feel like going back. Then he started a photostat shop in his hometown. In 2018, a YouTube channel called Craft Media was launched when the revenue from the shop was not enough. started doing cooking videos in it .The channel grew quickly. Months later, the Craft Media channel was renamed the Village Food Channel. Then he started a YouTube channel called Travel Master and started making personal videos. In the year 2021, he won the award of best food vlogger in 24 News Social Media Awards, the leading news channel in Malayalam.

Awards

See also
 List of YouTubers
 Karthik Surya

References 

Living people
Year of birth missing (living people)
People from Palakkad
Indian YouTubers
YouTube channels launched in 2018